is a fictional Japanese mascot character, unofficially representing the city of Funabashi, Chiba. It was created by a citizen of Funabashi with the objective of cheering up local residents and helping promote her hometown. It has subsequently appeared at events and festivals, as well as on numerous TV programs and commercials, gaining popularity around Japan. The character has also issued 4 CD albums and 6 singles, DVDs, starred in its own anime series and live-action drama special, headlined their own concert at Budokan, and opened its own character goods store. While they remain as an unofficial character, Funassyi is used frequently in official events for Chiba prefecture, the city of Funabashi and Japan herself due to their popularity and high name recognition.

Profile 
Funassyi is neither a girl or a boy but is a  fairy. Its parents are ordinary pear trees. Funassyi is the fourth of their 274 children. Its birthday is July 4, and it is 1,883 years old as of 2021 (in a literal time frame, it was possibly born in the year AD 138). The character is fond of heavy metal music, revealing that it bought Deep Purple's Machine Head as its first album, and is also fond of Aerosmith and Ozzy Osbourne.

Behavior 
Instead, they are usually accompanied by an attendant who speaks for them. Funassyi, however, always speaks for itself. It also often shrieks, jumps, dances, and makes violent movements like headbanging.

The number 274 appears in a lot of Funassyi's material (e.g. as the number of siblings, on license plates, as a house number, as a team jersey number). Under the rules of Japanese number puns, one possible reading of this number is "fu-na-shi".

History
The character was first created by a Funabashi citizen involved in retail trade in November 2011 as an illustration to advertise his business. A Twitter account was opened for it on November 21. At first, the creator didn't intend to make Funassyi a physical reality, however, the number of followers on Twitter increased far more than he expected and Funassyi became very popular. He then decided to create the suit (kigurumi, in Japanese) of Funassyi.
From April 7, 2012, videos were uploaded on YouTube.

In July 2012, Funassyi visited the Funabashi City Office to have it authorized and supported officially, but this was rejected. On October 30, 2013, Funassyi was awarded a certificate for its contributions in promoting Funabashi all over Japan. However, the Funabashi Municipal Government, with the mutual consent of Funassyi, did not formally approve Funassyi as an official mascot of the city, since doing so might restrict Funassyi's activities.

On November 27, 2013, Funassyi released her first CD single,  collaborating with Toshihiko "Takamiy" Takamizawa of The Alfee, on the Far Eastern Tribe Records label.

In June 2014, Funassyi was interviewed by CNN. In August 2014, Funassyi was taught how to pitch by Billy the Marlin, the official mascot of the American Miami Marlins baseball team.

On December 17, 2014, Funassyi released a full CD Album,  on Universal Music Japan's Universal Sigma label.

On March 5, 2015, Funassyi held a press conference for the overseas media at the Foreign Correspondents' Club of Japan.

On March 6, 2015, Funassyi opened her flagship store, Funassyiland, in the Lalaport Tokyo Bay shopping center in her hometown, Funabashi. A 2nd Funassyiland store opened in Umeda, Osaka in July 2015, and a 3rd store named Funassyiland Select opened in December 2015 in Harajuku, Tokyo inside the Kiddy Land store. A 4th store opened in April 2016 in Nagoya. An online Funassyiland store opened in November 2015.

From March to September 2015, an animated version of Funassyi starred in her own short-anime series, which aired every weekday during the Sukkiri! morning news and variety show on Nippon TV. The series has been released on DVD.

On January 7, 2016, a life-action 2 hour drama starring Funassyi titled  aired on Fuji TV.

On August 23, 2016, Funassyi headlined a concert called Nassyi Fes at Budokan in Tokyo, drawing 12,000 fans. Nassyi Fes was also held on the 29th of the same month at Osaka-jō Hall in Osaka.

Offshoot characters and imitations  
Funassyi's "brother" , was introduced on October 15, 2014. Funagoro is the 56th brother of Funassyi ("Goro" is both a masculine given name, and a possible number pun reading of the number 56 in Japanese). Funagoro is half-pear, half-caterpillar. The major difference between Funagoro and Funassyi is that Funagoro has a caterpillar tail that squirts silk thread. When Funagoro speaks, it usually ends the sentences with "nappi" (なっぴー).

Funassyi appears on the Tamagotchi 4U officially released by Bandai as a promotional touch spot character named "Funassyitchi". Along with the character, the package also includes a golden pear and an electric guitar.

A number of characters "inspired" by Funassyi, some sanctioned and some not, have appeared in the past. Sanctioned characters include Funyassyi, created to promote the Shironeko Project game, and Akanassyi, a red version of the usual yellow Funassyi character that was created to promote a Gundam movie in 2015.

As of 2016, Funagoro and Funyassyi appear frequently at Funassyiland stores and other events, with or without Funassyi.

Speculation regarding income and revenue generated by the character
There has been frequent speculation in the Japanese media regarding Funassyi's personal income, as well as the revenue he helps to generate for the city of Funabashi and Chiba prefecture. However, due to his unofficial status, they're a private enterprise and is not required to disclose any such figures. Funassyi has given various off-the-cuff answers to the question of how much he earns over the years, ranging from "274 yen per hour" to "1000 pears per hour".

See also 
 Yuru-chara
 Kumamon
 Hikonyan
 Choruru
 Kigurumi

References

External links 

  
274ch  - Official fan club 
Funassyiland  - Official retail stores
   - no longer updated as of January 2015.
 
Universal Music Japan Artist List 
JapON! Funassyi on MTV 81 

Advertising characters
Funabashi
Japanese mascots
City mascots
Fictional characters from Kantō